Iron(II) sulfate (British English: iron(II) sulphate) or ferrous sulfate denotes a range of salts with the formula Fe SO4·xH2O. These compounds exist most commonly as the heptahydrate (x = 7) but several values for x are known. The hydrated form is used medically to treat iron deficiency, and also for industrial applications. Known since ancient times as copperas and as green vitriol (vitriol is an archaic name for sulfate), the blue-green heptahydrate (hydrate with 7 molecules of water) is the most common form of this material. All the iron(II) sulfates dissolve in water to give the same aquo complex [Fe(H2O)6]2+, which has octahedral molecular geometry and is paramagnetic. The name copperas dates from times when the copper(II) sulfate was known as blue copperas, and perhaps in analogy, iron(II) and zinc sulfate were known respectively as green and white copperas.

It is on the World Health Organization's List of Essential Medicines. In 2020, it was the 116th most commonly prescribed medication in the United States, with more than 5million prescriptions.

Uses
Industrially, ferrous sulfate is mainly used as a precursor to other iron compounds. It is a reducing agent, and as such is useful for the reduction of chromate in cement to less toxic Cr(III) compounds. Historically ferrous sulfate was used in the textile industry for centuries as a dye fixative. It is used historically to blacken leather and as a constituent of iron gall ink. The preparation of sulfuric acid ('oil of vitriol') by the distillation of green vitriol (iron(II) sulfate) has been known for at least 700 years.

Medical use

Plant growth
Iron(II) sulfate is sold as ferrous sulfate, a soil amendment for lowering the pH of a high alkaline soil so that plants can access the soil's nutrients.

In horticulture it is used for treating iron chlorosis. Although not as rapid-acting as ferric EDTA, its effects are longer-lasting. It can be mixed with compost and dug into the soil to create a store which can last for years. Ferrous sulfate can be used as a lawn conditioner. It can also be used to eliminate silvery thread moss in golf course putting greens.

Pigment and craft
Ferrous sulfate can be used to stain concrete and some limestones and sandstones a yellowish rust color.

Woodworkers use ferrous sulfate solutions to color maple wood a silvery hue.

Green vitriol is also a useful reagent in the identification of mushrooms.

Historical uses
Ferrous sulfate was used in the manufacture of inks, most notably iron gall ink, which was used from the middle ages until the end of the 18th century. Chemical tests made on the Lachish letters showed the possible presence of iron. It is thought that oak galls and copperas may have been used in making the ink on those letters. It also finds use in wool dyeing as a mordant. Harewood, a material used in marquetry and parquetry since the 17th century, is also made using ferrous sulfate.

Two different methods for the direct application of indigo dye were developed in England in the 18th century and remained in use well into the 19th century. One of these, known as china blue, involved iron(II) sulfate. After printing an insoluble form of indigo onto the fabric, the indigo was reduced to leuco-indigo in a sequence of baths of ferrous sulfate (with reoxidation to indigo in air between immersions). The china blue process could make sharp designs, but it could not produce the dark hues of other methods.

In the second half of the 1850s ferrous sulfate was used as a photographic developer for collodion process images.

Hydrates
Iron(II) sulfate can be found in various states of hydration, and several of these forms exist in nature or were created synthetically.
 FeSO4·H2O (mineral: szomolnokite, relatively rare, monoclinic)
 FeSO4·H2O (synthetic compound stable at pressures exceeding 6.2 GPa, triclinic)
 FeSO4·4H2O (mineral: rozenite, white, relatively common, may be dehydration product of melanterite, monoclinic)
 FeSO4·5H2O (mineral: siderotil, relatively rare, triclinic)
 FeSO4·6H2O (mineral: ferrohexahydrite, very rare, monoclinic)
 FeSO4·7H2O (mineral: melanterite, blue-green, relatively common, monoclinic)

The tetrahydrate is stabilized when the temperature of aqueous solutions reaches . At  these solutions form both the tetrahydrate and monohydrate.

Mineral forms are found in oxidation zones of iron-bearing ore beds, e.g. pyrite, marcasite, chalcopyrite, etc. They are also found in related environments, like coal fire sites. Many rapidly dehydrate and sometimes oxidize. Numerous other, more complex (either basic, hydrated, and/or containing additional cations) Fe(II)-bearing sulfates exist in such environments, with copiapite being a common example.

Production and reactions
In the finishing of steel prior to plating or coating, the steel sheet or rod is passed through pickling baths of sulfuric acid. This treatment produces large quantities of iron(II) sulfate as a by-product.
Fe + H2SO4 → FeSO4 + H2

Another source of large amounts results from the production of titanium dioxide from ilmenite via the sulfate process.

Ferrous sulfate is also prepared commercially by oxidation of pyrite:
2 FeS2 + 7 O2 + 2 H2O → 2 FeSO4 + 2 H2SO4
It can be produced by displacement of metals less reactive than Iron from solutions of their sulfate:
CuSO4 + Fe → FeSO4 + Cu

Reactions

Upon dissolving in water, ferrous sulfates form the metal aquo complex [Fe(H2O)6]2+, which is an almost colorless, paramagnetic ion.

On heating, iron(II) sulfate first loses its water of crystallization and the original green crystals are converted into a white anhydrous solid. When further heated, the anhydrous material decomposes into sulfur dioxide and sulfur trioxide, leaving a reddish-brown iron(III) oxide.
2FeSO_4->[\Delta]Fe_2O_3 + SO_2 + SO_3

Like other iron(II) salts, iron(II) sulfate is a reducing agent. For example, it reduces nitric acid to nitrogen monoxide and chlorine to chloride:
6 FeSO4 + 3 H2SO4 + 2 HNO3 → 3 Fe2(SO4)3 + 4 H2O + 2 NO
6 FeSO4 + 3 Cl2 → 2 Fe2(SO4)3 + 2 FeCl3
Its mild reducing power is of value in organic synthesis. It is used as the iron catalyst component of Fenton's reagent.

Ferrous sulfate can be detected by the cerimetric method, which is the official method of the Indian Pharmacopoeia. This method includes the use of ferroin solution showing a red to light green colour change during titration.

See also
Iron(III) sulfate (ferric sulfate), the other common simple sulfate of iron.
Copper(II) sulfate
Ammonium iron(II) sulfate, also known as Mohr's salt, the common double salt of ammonium sulfate with iron(II) sulfate.
Chalcanthum
Ephraim Seehl known as an early manufacturer of Iron(II) sulfate, which he called 'green vitriol'.

References

External links 

 

Iron(II) compounds
Sulfates
World Health Organization essential medicines